Orlando Azinhais (9 September 1933 – 12 March 2005) was a Portuguese épée, foil and sabre fencer. He competed in three events at the 1960 Summer Olympics.

References

External links
 

1933 births
2005 deaths
Portuguese male épée fencers
Olympic fencers of Portugal
Fencers at the 1960 Summer Olympics
Portuguese male foil fencers
Portuguese male sabre fencers